Pepe Romero (born March 8, 1944, in Málaga, Spain) is a classical and flamenco guitarist.

Biography

Early life 

Pepe Romero was born in Spain, the second son of celebrated guitarist and composer Celedonio Romero, who was his only guitar teacher. His first professional appearance was in a shared concert with his father at the Teatro Lope de Vega, Seville, when Pepe was only seven years old, playing a gavotte by Bach and Sevilla by Albéniz. In 1957 Celedonio Romero left Franco's Spain for the United States with his singer actress wife, Angelita, and his three sons, Celin, Pepe and Angel, settling in the San Diego area.

Teaching 
Romero served as guitar professor at the University of Southern California, Southern Methodist University, University of San Diego and University of California at San Diego, before taking up the post of adjunct professor at USC Thornton School of Music.

Romero published a guitar method, La Guitarra, in 2012.

Career 
In 1959, Pepe made his first recording, featuring traditional flamenco music of his native Andalucia.  At 16, he performed for the first time in Los Angeles, playing flamenco with his father and brothers Celin and Angel.

As a soloist Pepe Romero has appeared in the United States, Canada, Europe, China, the Middle-East, Japan, and Australia with, variously, the London, Toronto, Philadelphia, Cleveland, Chicago, Houston, Pittsburgh, Boston, San Francisco and Dallas symphony orchestras, as well as with the Orpheus Chamber Orchestra, the New York, Bogotá and Los Angeles philharmonic orchestras, the Boston Pops Orchestra, the Hong Kong Sinfonietta, the Academy of St Martin in the Fields, the Monte-Carlo Philharmonic Orchestra, I Musici, the Zurich Chamber Orchestra, the Philharmonia Hungarica, the Hungarian State Orchestra, the Spanish National Orchestra, the Spanish National Radio/Television Orchestra, the Orchestre de la Suisse Romande, the New Moscow Chamber Orchestra, the Springfield Symphony Orchestra, the Lausanne Chamber Orchestra, the American Sinfonietta, and the Bournemouth Symphony Orchestra. He has been a special guest at the festivals of Salzburg, Israel, Schleswig-Holstein, Menuhin, Osaka, Granada, Istanbul, Ravinia, Garden State, Hollywood Bowl, Blossom, Wolf Trap, Saratoga and Hong Kong.

Romero has recorded over 60 albums, including 20 concerti with the Academy of St Martin in the Fields, and 30 albums as part of the famed guitar quartet The Romeros. He has played for Presidents Carter and Nixon, the Queen of the Netherlands, the Prince of Wales and Pope John Paul II. He has numerous international recording awards to his credit and has received an Honorary Doctorate in Music from the University of Victoria, British Columbia, Canada.

His contributions to the field of classical guitar have inspired a number of distinguished composers to write works specifically for him, including Joaquín Rodrigo, Federico Moreno Torroba, Francisco de Madina, Lorenzo Palomo, Michael Zearott, Paul Chihara, Enrique Diemecke, Ernesto Cordero and Celedonio Romero.  He was personally chosen by the legendary Andrés Segovia for the world premiere of Torroba's Diálogos entre guitarra y orquesta.

Of performing, Romero said,
Music makes us communicate through our soul, and if you can leave the theatre feeling that connection, that’s what I want more than anything.

Although originally a classical guitarist, he is talented in flamenco and a popular flamenco performer. His most famous flamenco-only album is called ¡Flamenco Fenómeno!

The Romero Guitar Quartet 

 1960–90: Celedonio Romero, Celin Romero, Pepe Romero, Angel Romero
 1990–96: Celedonio Romero, Celin Romero, Pepe Romero, Celino Romero
 since 1996: Celin Romero, Pepe Romero, Celino Romero, Lito Romero

Honors 

For contribution to the arts, he received the Premio Andalucía de la Músicahe in June 1996.

On February 11, 2000, King Juan Carlos I of Spain knighted Pepe Romero and his brothers, Celin and Angel, into the Order of Isabella the Catholic. The official ceremony of this high honor took place at the USC Thornton School of Music, and included a gala performance by The Romeros with the Thornton Chamber Orchestra. He is currently Adjunct Professor of Classical Guitar at the Thornton School, where he was named "Distinguished Artist in Residence" in 2004.

In 2007, the Romero Quartet received the President's Merit Award from the Recording Academy, the producers of the Grammy Awards, and, in November 2012, Romero's recording of Concierto festivo by Ernesto Cordero was nominated for Best Classical Album at the Latin Grammy Awards.

Guitars 
Initially, Romero shared his father’s Santos Hernandez. In 1958, he bought a Miguel Rodriguez from Córdoba which he played until 1969.  He then played a Hermann Hauser II before finally, in 1973, obtaining another Rodriguez which was his principal instrument until at least 2014.

Discography

Solo Recordings or Soloist with Orchestra 

(*) denotes albums where one side of the album was Pepe Romero and the second side was Los Romeros
(**) denotes albums that where mainly Pepe Romero with some involvement of the rest of Los Romeros

Pepe Romero with Los Romeros

References

External links 
 Official site
 Romero guitar quartet official site
Pepe Romero Interview - NAMM Oral History Library (2015)
 Pepe Romero playing Malagueña

Spanish classical guitarists
Spanish flamenco guitarists
Spanish male guitarists
People from Málaga
Musicians from Andalusia
1944 births
Living people
Musicians awarded knighthoods
Contemporary Records artists
Flamenco guitarists